A Christmas Song is the first Christmas album by singer-songwriter Russ Taff. It is his one and only album released in 1992 on the Sparrow label. Taff and his wife Tori dedicated the song "What a Wonderful World" to their newborn daughter Madeleine Rose Taff who was born in the summer of 1992 while making this album. The album is produced by Taff's guitarist James Hollihan, Jr. A concert video was also released of the same name featuring Taff and his band performing at a nightclub. A Christmas Song peaked at number six on the Billboard Top Christian Albums chart.

Track listing

Personnel 
 Russ Taff – vocals
 Matt Rollings – grand piano, vibraphone
 James Hollihan Jr. – guitars, backing vocals, all arrangements
 Byron House – bass 
 John Hammond – drums, sleigh bells
 Mark Douthit – saxophones 
 Mike Haynes – trumpets
 John Darnall – string conductor
 Nashville String Machine – strings 

Production
 John Huie – executive producer 
 James Hollihan Jr. – producer, recording, mixing 
 Lynn Fuston – string recording 
 Hank Williams – mastering at MasterMix (Nashville, Tennessee)
 Simon Levy – art direction 
 Garrett Rittenberry – design 
 David Roth – photography 
 Jeffrey Tay – stylist 
 Robyn Lynch – hair, make-up 
 Zack Glickman – management

Charts

References

1992 Christmas albums
Russ Taff albums
Sparrow Records albums
Christmas albums by American artists
Jazz albums by American artists